János Manninger (Magyaróvár, 12 September 1901 – Budapest, 1 April 1946) was a Hungarian photographer, director.

Biography
His father was János Manninger (1869–1923), his mother was Mária Szilágyi (1880–1960). He learnt at his home town, Mosonmagyaróvár. He was a photographer at Humnia Film Factory. Then he moved to Berlin. His first film is from 1928.  He went to London, where he worked as a journalist, then went back to Hungary, where he killed himself.

Sources
 Magyar életrajzi lexikon IV.: 1978–1991 (A–Z). Főszerk. Kenyeres Ágnes. Budapest: Akadémiai. 1994.

External links
 Filmkatalógus.hu
 Moson Megyei Életrajzi Lexikon

1901 births
1946 suicides
People from Mosonmagyaróvár
Hungarian film directors
Hungarian photographers
Suicides in Hungary